Craig Leahy (born 1 September 1989 in Glanmire, County Cork) is an Irish sportsperson. He plays hurling at club level with Sarsfields and was called up to the Cork senior inter-county team in 2009 due to the 2008-2009 Cork Hurlers strike.

References

1989 births
Living people
Sarsfields (Cork) hurlers
Cork inter-county hurlers